Infinite Recharge (stylized in all caps) is the FIRST Robotics Competition (FRC) game for the 2021 season. The season is in partnership with Lucasfilm as part of its Star Wars: Force for Change initiative. 

Due to the COVID-19 pandemic, the 2021 season is the first season in history to begin with no events scheduled, with teams instead invited to take part in three virtual challenges that will include judged awards. FIRST has also committed to regular reevaluations of the status of the pandemic to determine if in-person events are possible, with the first reevaluation taking place in January. In light of this, some districts had developed plans for limited hybrid events. For example, FIRST Chesapeake, which runs events in Maryland, Virginia, and Washington, D.C., had plans for events that would have taken place in March and April. After completing a review of health measures and COVID statistics, FIRST announced that no North American events would be approved until June 2021.
 
Teams have also worked on their own individual projects, such as producing personal protective equipment (i.e. face masks). Other teams are taking the season off to develop improvements to their robot that can be applied to future seasons, such as a new drive system.

Kickoff
Kickoff took place on January 9, 2021. The event was streamed over Twitch and featured presentations on the three virtual challenges that will make up a major part of the season.

Field and Rules

The 2021 field is relatively similar to the 2020 field, with no changes that will significantly impact robot design. See below for a summary of changes for the 2021 season.

Field and Rule Changes

Challenges and Events
For the 2021 season, virtual challenges are currently expected to take the place of most events. If events do take place, they will occur later in the season, which has been extended to at least early August. For each challenge, teams were assigned to a judging group with other teams from across the world.

Virtual Challenges

Game Design Challenge
This challenge will ask teams to create a proposal for a hypothetical FRC game. Teams are allowed to use real-world, virtual, and/or hybrid elements, and will be able to receive awards based on a judge's evaluation of their proposal. Proposals will also be considered for development into a future official game. Teams that participate in this challenge may be eligible to receive the Designer's Award, the Concept Award, the Imagery Award, the Creativity Award, the Engineering Design Award, and/or the Rookie Design Award.

Innovation Challenge
In this challenge, teams will be asked to design a solution to a problem that is related to the 2020-2021 FIRST season's theme, Game Changers. Teams will then present their solutions, along with a business plan and pitch, to judges, who will evaluate each team's proposal and determine if they will advance to the next stage of the Challenge. The Challenge will culminate in the Global Innovation Awards on June 28-30, which will include a showcase, workshops, and a finalist judging session and awards ceremony.

Infinite Recharge at Home
This challenge will feature an individual robot and driver skills challenge based on Infinite Recharge field and game elements where teams can demonstrate their robot and compete with other teams for skills challenge awards. Teams will not be required to construct wooden field elements or use a carpet driving surface to complete the challenge. This challenge will also include traditional technical awards, albeit with virtual presentations to judges. Unlike in previous seasons, teams will not be required to have access to their robot to be eligible for these awards. The technical awards that will be presented as part of this challenge are the Autonomous Award, the Excellence in Engineering Award, the Rookie Game Changer Award, the Industrial Design Award, and the Quality Award. Additionally, the team with the highest skills challenge score in their judging group will receive the skills challenge winner award and the team with the second highest score will receive the skills challenge finalist award.

Skills Challenges

End-of-Season Awards Shows
On June 26 and 30, FIRST held two awards shows to present traditional end-of-season awards as well as awards from two of the three virtual challenges. Infinite Recharge at Home was not represented because all awards in that challenge were presented at the judging group level. Traditional awards and awards from the Game Design Challenge were presented on June 26, while awards from the Innovation Challenge were presented on June 30.

References

Notes

For Inspiration and Recognition of Science and Technology
Robotics competitions
FIRST Robotics Competition games
2021 in robotics